The Outward Processing Arrangement (OPA) concerns the textile industry in Hong Kong and the People's Republic of China. It states that Hong Kong manufacturers can subcontract subsidiary and finishing processes to mainland factories, as long as the "major transformation" of the garment takes place in Hong Kong. Major transformation, however, only needs to amount to 10% of total cloth processing. Any products exported to China for outward processing must be reimported to Hong Kong within 2 months. Effective from 10 June 2005, Hong Kong manufacturers can apply to the Trade and Industry Department of Hong Kong for exemption of export duty in association with the processed garments as they are being exported from China.

References

External links
 Outward Processing Arrangement (OPA): Exemption from Mainland Export Duty (archived from the original on 26 September 2007): links to related publications by the Hong Kong Trade and Industry Department

Commercial treaties
Economy of Hong Kong